Shaheed may refer to:

 Shaheed, the Arabic word for martyr, usually applied to Muslim martyrs, which originates from the Arabic word شاهد ) meaning "witness"
 In South Asia, "Shaheed" has now become synonymous with patriotic martyrdom in general, regardless of faith
 Martyrdom in Sikhism
 Ash-Shaheed, one of the names of God in Islam

People
Shahid (name) or Shaheed, a male given name and surname (includes a list of people with this name)

 Shahid (actor), a Pakistani film actor

Geography
 Shahid, Fars, a village in Fars Province, Iran
 Shahid, Isfahan, a village in Isfahan Province, Iran
 Shahid, Markazi, a village in Markazi Province, Iran

Organizations
Shahed Aviation Industries, an Iranian aerospace company

Films and television

 Shahid (service)
 Shaheed (1948 film)
 Shaheed (1962 film)
 Shaheed (1965 film)
 Shaheed (1996 film)
 Shaheed (2001 film)
Shaheed-E-Azam, a 2002 Indian film
 Shahid (film), 2013 Indian film